John Bachtell (born March 26, 1956) is a far-left politician, American Marxist, activist, trade unionist, and community organizer who served as the Chairman of the National Committee of the Communist Party USA from its 30th National Convention in 2014 until its 31st National Convention in 2019.

Career
Bachtell worked as an organizer for the Communist Party in Illinois and was a member of the party's National Committee. He was for a time the leader of the New York party.

In an article published in Political Affairs magazine right after his election, Bachtell laid out his analysis of the contemporary political situation in the United States and how Communists should conduct themselves within it. He emphasized that the Communist Party will seek a peaceful transition to socialism so long as it is possible, saying "Given the development of democratic institutions and traditions in the U.S., involvement in the electoral arena and political action is essential and grows in importance. It entails building broad anti-ultra right, reform and anti-monopoly coalitions that win majorities and thus power in every democratic institution e.g., school boards, planning boards, city council, county boards, state legislature, federal office, in 'red' and 'blue' states."

References

 

1956 births
Living people
American communists
Antioch College alumni
People from Yellow Springs, Ohio
People from Chicago
Communist Party USA politicians
 Far-left politicians in the United States
Illinois socialists
Ohio socialists
Far-left politics in the United States